Stephen Charles Smith (27 March 1896–1980) was an English footballer who played in the Football League for Charlton Athletic, Clapton Orient, Queens Park Rangers, Southend United and West Ham United.

References

1896 births
1980 deaths
English footballers
Association football forwards
English Football League players
West Ham United F.C. players
Charlton Athletic F.C. players
Southend United F.C. players
Leyton Orient F.C. players
Queens Park Rangers F.C. players
Mansfield Town F.C. players